Cherry Lake is part of historical coastal wetlands in Altona, a suburb of Melbourne, Australia.  The wetlands were converted to a lake with construction of retaining walls, levees, and flow channels. The lake and surrounding reserve is an important wildlife habitat and popular recreational destination.

Flora and fauna
Cherry Lake and nearby Truganina Swamp are habitat for the native sedge, chaffy sawsedge (Gahnia filum).  The sedgefields provide food and habitat for the endangered Altona skipper butterfly (Hesperilla flavescens flavescens).

The lake and associated salt marsh vegetation provides habitat for pelicans, black swans and purple swamphens.

Weed control is carried out on a regular basis, targeting spiny rush, serrated tussock and boxthorn.

Mosquito larvae numbers are monitored and a biological agent is occasionally utilised for control. Rabbit control is also undertaken.

Construction
The lake was created in the 1960s as a flood retention basin for  residential expansion in Altona and Brooklyn. Prior to this, it was a motor racing circuit, constructed in 1954 at a cost of 35,000 pounds.

Levees were constructed on the south and east side of the lake with a spillway and channel which discharges excess water to Port Phillip Bay. These help to maintain a relatively constant water level of around one metre in depth. An additional higher levee bank was constructed to prevent floodwaters from Kororoit Creek sweeping across the lake toward residential areas.

Recreational and community use

The lake attracts boats, windsurfers and anglers. Waterbirds can be viewed from a bird hide.

A 3.7 kilometre long shared walking and bicycle path encircles the lake, connected to the Hobsons Bay Coastal Trail. Other facilities in the reserve include a playground, picnic shelter, barbecue, seating, toilets and car park which is accessed from Millers Road.
The Altona Lions Club hold an outdoor market on the first Sunday of every month (and the third Sunday in December) on the Millers Road side of the park.

Motor racing
Originally just a swamp, the Victorian Sporting Car Club built a 2.3 mile circuit in 1953–54. This circuit was known as the Altona Circuit. Unfortunately for the club, the swamp soon became a lake, with the circuit being completely covered by water during winter in 1955. It was used just once more in 1956 before closing for good.

After the closure of the Albert Park Circuit in 1958, it was proposed that a new circuit and facilities be built on the Cherry Lake site for the 1964 Australian Grand Prix, to be called Altona Park, but ultimately the facility was built in Sandown instead.

References

External links

Beautiful Altona 
Picturesque Altona
Hobsons Bay Community Online Forum
Attractions of Altona Map
Facebook Page on Events & Activities in Altona
"Friends of Cherry Lake"

Lakes of Melbourne
Melbourne Water catchment
Rivers of Greater Melbourne (region)
Parks in Melbourne
City of Hobsons Bay